Sadat City is a city in the Monufia Governorate, Egypt. It is named after late president Anwar Sadat. It is a first generation new urban community and one of the largest industrial cities in the country.

The city is surrounded by a 350 km2 green belt, which has earned it a place in the top ten list of environmentally friendly industrial cities in the Middle East.

Industry
Sadat City has industry in a variety of sectors and in 2017, more land was slated and offered for industrial investment in Sadat.

Climate 

Köppen climate classification system classifies its climate as hot desert (BWh).

See also
 List of cities and towns in Egypt

 Anwar Sadat
 Beheira Governorate
 6th of October City
 New Cairo
 New Borg El Arab
 Greater Cairo

References

External links 

Populated places in Monufia Governorate
New towns in Egypt
1978 establishments in Egypt
Cities in Egypt
Populated places established in 1978